The 2020 European motorcycle Grand Prix (officially known as the Gran Premio de Europa) was the thirteenth round of the 2020 Grand Prix motorcycle racing season and the twelfth round of the 2020 MotoGP World Championship. It was held at the Circuit Ricardo Tormo in Cheste on 8 November 2020.

Background

Impact of the COVID-19 pandemic 

The opening rounds of the 2020 championship have been heavily affected by the COVID-19 pandemic. Several Grands Prix were cancelled or postponed  after the aborted opening round in Qatar, prompting the Fédération Internationale de Motocyclisme to draft a new calendar. A new calendar based exclusively in Europe was announced on 11 June.
The organizers of the Valencian Community Grand Prix have signed a contract with Dorna Sports, owner of the commercial rights of the sport, to host a double stage at Circuit Ricardo Tormo, becoming the fifth circuit to host two consecutive races of the World Championship, and is the third time it takes place in Spain. But unlike the other double events of the season, the original Grand Prix will be preceded by the round introduced by the new calendar. The name chosen is that of the European Grand Prix, which returns to the world championship for the first time since 1995.

MotoGP Championship standings before the race 
After the eleventh round at the Teruel Grand Prix, Joan Mir leads the drivers' standings with 137 points, 14 more than Fabio Quartararo and 19 more than Maverick Viñales. Franco Morbidelli, after the victory in the Teruel stage, gains two positions and is fourth with 112 points and has three points against Andrea Dovizioso, now fifth.

In the constructors' classification, following the 50-point penalty imposed on Yamaha for failing to comply with the protocol that requires unanimous approval from the Motorcycle Sport Manufacturers Association (MSMA) for technical modifications (Yamaha would have changed valve specifications between the freezing of the homologation just before the abandoned round in Qatar and the opening round at Jerez), Ducati is the new leader with 171 points, followed by Suzuki at 163 points and Yamaha, which has lost the championship lead and now third at 158 points. Honda and KTM are fourth and fifth respectively at 143 and 117 points, while Aprilia closes the standings with 36 points.

In the team standings, Team Suzuki Ecstar leads with 242 points. Petronas Yamaha SRT and Monster Energy Yamaha, following the penalties of 37 and 20 points for technical modifications on their bikes, are respectively second (with 198 points) and fifth (with 156 points), the latter relegated by one position and overtaken by KTM Factory Racing by only one point. Ducati Team is third with 180 points.

MotoGP Entrants 

 Stefan Bradl replaced Marc Márquez for the tenth straight race while the latter recovered from injuries sustained in his opening round crash.
 Aprilia test rider and former World Superbike rider Lorenzo Savadori has been announced to replace Bradley Smith for the final three rounds in Valencia and Portugal, subsequently excluding Andrea Iannone from a start in 2020.
 Iker Lecuona is forced to miss the European Grand Prix due to Andorran quarantine rules, after his brother and assistant both tested positive for the SARS-CoV-2 virus. Tech3 elected not to replace him on such short notice.
 After delays to Valentino Rossi's SARS-CoV-2 recovery, Yamaha World Superbike rider Garrett Gerloff was announced initially to replace Rossi at the European Grand Prix. Gerloff completed the Friday sessions of free practice, before two subsequent negative tests from Rossi allowed him to return to the paddock beginning with the third practice session on Saturday.

Free practice

MotoGP 
The first session, held in wet conditions, Jack Miller was the fastest ahead of Franco Morbidelli and Stefan Bradl. In the second session, on a dry track, Miller confirmed his leadership in the standings ahead of Aleix Espargaró and Morbidelli. The third session, held in wet conditions, Johann Zarco set the best time ahead of Maverick Viñales and Takaaki Nakagami.

Combined Free Practice 1-2-3 
The top ten riders (written in bold) qualified in Q2.

Personal Best lap

Notes
 Garrett Gerloff participated in the first two sessions having been initially chosen by Yamaha as a replacement for Valentino Rossi (his best times were in FP1 1:43.645, in FP2 1:34.107).

In the fourth session Miguel Oliveira was the fastest ahead of Joan Mir and Miller.

Qualifying

MotoGP 
 

Notes
  – Aleix Espargaró and Jack Miller set identical times in Q2; Aleix Espargaró was classified ahead as he set his lap time before Miller.
  – Aleix Espargaró received a 3-place grid penalty for ignoring blue flags.
  – Maverick Viñales received a penalty for the start of the pit lane for changing the engine and mounting the sixth of the season.

Warm up

MotoGP 
In the warm up, Joan Mir was the fastest ahead of Aleix Espargaró and Jack Miller.

Race

MotoGP

Moto2

 Augusto Fernández suffered a foot injury in a crash during practice and withdrew from the event.
 Jake Dixon suffered a fractured right wrist in a crash during practice and withdrew from the event.

Moto3

 Albert Arenas was black flagged for irresponsible riding.

Championship standings after the race
Below are the standings for the top five riders, constructors, and teams after the round.

MotoGP

Riders' Championship standings

Constructors' Championship standings

Teams' Championship standings

Moto2

Riders' Championship standings

Constructors' Championship standings

Teams' Championship standings

Moto3

Riders' Championship standings

Constructors' Championship standings

Teams' Championship standings

Notes

References

External links

Europe
European motorcycle Grand Prix
European motorcycle Grand Prix
European motorcycle Grand Prix